Joint Force Command Lisbon was one of the largest NATO bases in south Europe Allied Command Operations. It was based in Oeiras, near Lisbon, Portugal. In 2009 a French lieutenant general took command from the previous US Navy admiral who had filled the post for a number of years. It was deactivated in 2012.

History
From 1972, for many years during the Cold War, Oeiras was home to Commander Iberian Atlantic. Commanders during this period included Rear Admiral Eugene B. Fluckley and Robert Erly of the U.S. Navy. On September 18, 1982, the Defence Committee of the North Atlantic Council redesignated Commander IBERLANT (COMIBERLANT) as Commander-in-Chief IBERLANT (CINCIBERLANT) and the Portuguese Vice-Admiral Ilídio Elias da Costa took command. CINCIBERLANT was responsible to SACLANT in Norfolk, Virginia. On 1 September 1999, the CINCIBERLANT command was upgraded to CINCSOUTHLANT, a NATO regional command with new terms of reference and a greater area of responsibility. The headquarters becomes Regional Headquarters South Atlantic (RHQ SOUTHLANT). On 12 June 2003, command authority for CINCSOUTHLANT was transferred from SACLANT to SACEUR, NATO's European command in Belgium.

On 4 December 2006, SACEUR rewarded Joint Command Lisbon with a Campaign Pennant to recognize the operational contribution during the Pakistan Earthquake Relief Operation.

In 2009 Joint Command Lisbon was responsible for providing assistance to the African Union on request, principally as regards airlift for the mission in Darfur; preparing staff to command the NATO Response Force; mounting a sea-based Combined Joint Task Force Headquarters; and support for cooperation and dialogue under the Partnership for Peace and Mediterranean Dialogue programmes.

During the 2000s (decade), the commander was a United States Navy vice admiral who simultaneously held the position of commander of United States Sixth Fleet and commander of Naval Striking and Support Forces NATO (STRIKFORNATO, the old STRIKFORSOUTH), both located in Naples, Italy. The admiral resided in Lisbon and commanded the three commands separated by the western Mediterranean through a rigorous travel schedule and electronic means, including frequent video teleconferences. Vice Admiral Bruce W. Clingan was the last U.S. commander to hold the three commands simultaneously.

References

External links
Allied Joint Force Command Lisbon

Formations of the NATO Military Command Structure 1994–present
Organisations based in Lisbon
Military units and formations disestablished in 2012